Mike Lush (born April 18, 1958) is a former American football defensive back. He played for the Philadelphia/Baltimore Stars from 1983 to 1985, the Indianapolis Colts and Minnesota Vikings in 1986 and for the Atlanta Falcons in 1987.

References

1958 births
Living people
Sportspeople from Allentown, Pennsylvania
Players of American football from Pennsylvania
American football defensive backs
East Stroudsburg Warriors football players
Philadelphia/Baltimore Stars players
Indianapolis Colts players
Minnesota Vikings players
Atlanta Falcons players
National Football League replacement players